Simone Greselin (born 5 June 1998) is an Italian football player who plays as a midfielder for Serie D club Livorno.

Club career

Giana Erminio
On 9 January 2016, Greselin made his professional debut in Serie C for Giana Erminio as a substitute replacing Simone Perico in the 76th minute of a 2–1 home defeat against Pordenone. On 8 May, Greselin played his first match as a starter, a 3–1 away defeat against Pordenone, he was replaced by Marco Costa in the 69th minute. On 30 October he scored his first professional goal in the 25th minute of a 3–0 home win over Racing Roma. On 30 December he played his first entire match for Giana Erminio, a 3–2 home defeat against Robur Siena. On 11 May 2018, Greselin scored his second goal, as a substitute, in the 94th minute of a 4–2 away defeat against Piacenza in the Serie C play-off.

Return to Giana Erminio
He returned to Giana Erminio on 6 December 2019, signing a contract until the end of the 2019–20 season.

Rimini
On 13 August 2021, he joined to Serie D club Rimini.

Career statistics

Club

References

External links 
 

1998 births
Living people
People from Cernusco sul Naviglio
Footballers from Lombardy
Italian footballers
Association football midfielders
Serie C players
A.S. Giana Erminio players
S.S.D. Lucchese 1905 players
Rimini F.C. 1912 players
Sportspeople from the Metropolitan City of Milan